Krešimir "Krešo" Golik (20 May 1922 – 20 September 1996) was a Croatian film and television director and screenwriter. In a creative career spanning five decades between the late 1940s and late 1980s, Golik directed a number of critically acclaimed feature films, short subjects and television series.

Working almost exclusively at Zagreb-based production companies Jadran Film, Zagreb Film and Croatia Film, Golik is regarded as one of the most important directors in Croatian cinema and his 1970 comedy One Song a Day Takes Mischief Away is widely regarded as the greatest Croatian film ever made.

According to Croatian film scholar Ivo Škrabalo, Golik was "the only Croatian film-maker who managed to retain his integrity in all the periods of the post-war Croatian cinema, from its beginnings in the service of the propaganda of the victorious communist system to the last years of its existence".

Life and career
Golik was born in Fužine, where he completed his primary education. He went to the Gymnasium and the schools of graphic design in Senj and Zagreb. He worked as a sports journalist on Radio Zagreb and a director of newsreels in Jadran Film. In 1947, Golik started his professional film career. His first feature film was Plavi 9 (Blue 9, 1950). That film is a bizarre mixture of the Soviet-style industrial epic, romantic comedy and football film. It is famous for superbly directed football sequences. After release it quickly became the biggest hit of then-young Yugoslav cinema.

During the 50s, Golik directed also  Djevojka i hrast (The Young Girl and the Oak, 1955). At the early sixties, one historian accidentally revealed that Golik worked as a journalist during the Ustashe Nazi regime, at the time when he was teenager. Because of that reveal, Golik was banned from directing for almost a decade, but continued working as an assistant. His comeback was marked by anthological documentary Od 3 do 22 (From 3 to 22, 1966), one of the best documentaries of the Yugoslav "black wave".

His melodramatic comedy films I Have Two Mothers and Two Fathers (1968) and One Song a Day Takes Mischief Away (1970) were the pinnacle of his career, humorously depicting the Zagreb middle class under communism and between the world wars, respectively. Those two films (especially the latter) have been regularly included among the top 10 Croatian films of all time, both by critics and audiences. "He Who Sings..." is considered as most popular film about Zagreb, and its popularity was so huge that fast-food chain held the name of the characters of the movie.

Golik was very successful on TV too. He made TV films and dramas. His greatest TV success was another comedy: Gruntovčani, a series about the life of villagers in the Croatian region of Podravina. It was shot in Northwestern Croatian kajkavian dialect. The success of the series encouraged the renaissance of the use of dialects in contemporary Croatian culture.

From 1979 until his retirement in 1989, he taught film direction at the Zagreb Academy of Dramatic Art. He was awarded the Vladimir Nazor Award for a lifetime achievement. Krešo Golik died in Zagreb in September 1996.

Although he had done some artistically more pretentious work, Kreško Golik is most famous for his lightweight, entertaining films and seria. That's the reason why he is often compared to Billy Wilder and Lubitsch. Atypically for an Eastern European author, Golik is a skillful entertainer, master of irony, director who depicts his characters with sentimental humor. He is most popular film director within Croatia, and often considered as a best representative of the Croatian middle-class mentality.

Selected filmography
Plavi 9 (1950; director and writer)
The Girl and the Oak (Djevojka i hrast, 1955; director)
Kala (1958; director)
Martin in the Clouds (Martin u oblacima, 1961; writer)
Superfluous (Prekobrojna, 1962; writer)
Nikoletina Bursać (1964; writer)
I Have Two Mothers and Two Fathers (Imam dvije mame i dva tate, 1968; director and writer)
One Song a Day Takes Mischief Away (Tko pjeva zlo ne misli, 1970; director and writer)
To Live on Love (Živjeti od ljubavi, 1973; director and writer)
Razmeđa (1973; director)
Pucanj (1977; director)
Violet (Ljubica, 1978; director)
The Orchid Villa (Vila Orhideja, 1988; director and writer)

References

External links

Krešo Golik biography at Filmski-Programi.hr 
Krešo Golik biography at Film.hr 

1922 births
1996 deaths
People from Fužine, Croatia
Croatian film directors
Vladimir Nazor Award winners
Croatian screenwriters
Yugoslav film directors
Burials at Mirogoj Cemetery
20th-century Croatian people
Croatian documentary film directors
20th-century screenwriters